Urasawa may refer to:

Naoki Urasawa (born 1960), Japanese manga artist and occasional musician
Urasawa (restaurant), a Michelin Guide 2-star restaurant located in Beverly Hills, California